Mutthaide Bhagya (Kannada: ಮುತ್ತೈದೆ ಭಾಗ್ಯ) is a 1983 Indian Kannada film, directed by K. N. Chandrashekar Sharma and produced by B. V. Radha. The film stars Tiger Prabhakar, Aarathi, Chandrashekar and Sundar Raj in the lead roles. This movie is a remake of Telugu movie, Pratheekaaram (1982), in which Sobhan Babu played dual roles. The film has musical score by Vijaya Bhaskar.

Cast

Tiger Prabhakar
Aarathi
Vishnuvardhan in Guest appearance
Chandrashekar
Sundar Raj
Pramila Joshai
Vajramuni
Sudheer
Jayamalini
Vijay Rangaraju
Kumari Manjula Sharma
Master Sanjay

Soundtrack

References

External links
 

1983 films
1980s Kannada-language films